Compound Eye Sessions is an collaboration between Marc Heal (Ashtrayhead, Cubanate) as MC Lord of the Flies and Raymond Watts (PIG, ex-KMFDM). Two songs from the PIG side of the EP titled "Drugzilla" and "Shake" were previously released as rough mixes on Marc Heal's personal SoundCloud page. A limited run of 500 physical copies was released by Armalyte Records on April 13, 2015. The EP is also available digitally through Bandcamp and iTunes. This release also marks the first official PIG release in ten years since 2005's Pigmata, that of which Marc Heal also contributed to.

Track listing

Credits
 Produced by Marc Heal
 Guitars and Engineering by Dan Abela
 Vocals and Programming by Marc Heal & Raymond Watts
 Shake and The Doll mixed by Eden
 Mastered by J K Seifert at KSS
 Sleeve Design by Luke Insect

References

Pig (musical project) albums
2015 albums